The Rough Guide To Acoustic Africa is a world music compilation album originally released in 2013 featuring acoustic music spanning Sub-Saharan Africa. Part of the World Music Network Rough Guides series, the album contains two discs: an overview of the genre on Disc One, and a "bonus" Disc Two highlighting griot Noumoucounda Cissoko. Disc One features artists hailing from Niger, Madagascar, the DRC, South Africa, Lesotho, Mozambique, Zimbabwe, Ghana, Cameroon, Mali, South Sudan, Sudan, Senegal, and Guinea. All but three tracks are guitar-based. The extensive liner notes were written by Daniel Rosenberg, and Phil Stanton, co-founder of the World Music Network, produced the album.

Critical reception

The recording received positive reviews. After admitting that compilations spanning many countries typically annoy him, Robert Christgau recounted this one as "soft-spoken" and "pretty" enough to award it an "A−". David Maine of PopMatters wrote that this release was consistent with Rough Guides' "knack for culling good tunes from a far-flung range of material". Maine was particularly impressed by Disc Two, comparing Cissoko with Salif Keita.

Track listing

Disc One

Disc Two
All tracks on Disc Two are by Noumoucounda Cissoko, a Senegalese kora-playing griot, from his 2012 digital album "Falling".

References

External links
 

2013 compilation albums
Acoustic Africa